Bondata Venkata Satyanarayan (9 May 1935 – 23 April 2004) was an Indian athlete. He competed in the men's long jump at the 1960 Summer Olympics and the 1964 Summer Olympics.

References

External links
 

1935 births
2004 deaths
People from Guntur district
Athletes (track and field) at the 1960 Summer Olympics
Athletes (track and field) at the 1964 Summer Olympics
Indian male long jumpers
Olympic athletes of India
20th-century Indian people